34 Pegasi is a triple star system in the northern constellation of Pegasus. It has a yellow-white hue and is dimly visible to the naked eye with an apparent visual magnitude of 5.76. The system is located at a distance of 131 light years from the Sun based on parallax, but is drifting closer with a radial velocity of −13.5 km/s. It has been catalogued as a member of the Hyades Supercluster, although its membership status remains doubtful.

A third member of the system has a poorly-constrained 420 year orbit around the main pair. This star was discovered by Burnham in 1874, and the discovery code BU 290 was given to the double.

The primary member, component Aa, is an F-type main-sequence star that is starting to evolve off the main sequence, with stellar classifications of F7V or F8IV−V, depending on the source. It is around three billion years old and is spinning with a projected rotational velocity of 8 km/s, with a measured rotation period of 12 days. The star has 1.3 times the mass of the Sun and 2.25 times the Sun's radius. It is radiating 6.7 times the luminosity of the Sun from its photosphere at an effective temperature of 6,200 K.

The secondary companion to the primary, component Ab, is most likely a red dwarf star with around 29% of the mass of the Sun. The tertiary member, component B, has 53% of the Sun's mass and a class of around K4.

References

F-type main-sequence stars
Spectroscopic binaries
Triple stars
Hyades Stream

Pegasus (constellation)
Durchmusterung objects
212754
62523